Roland Assinger (born 9 May 1973 in Hermagor-Pressegger See, Hermagor District, Carinthia) is an Austrian former alpine skier.

References

External links
 

1973 births
Living people
Austrian male alpine skiers